Tyler Booth is an American country music singer-songwriter, signed to a joint venture between Villa40 and Sony Music Nashville.

Background 
Born December 15, 1996, Booth was raised in Campton, Kentucky Wolfe County, Kentucky, which is in the Eastern part of the state. He grew up listening to Black Label Society, Five Finger Death Punch, Waylon Jennings and his father Jason's rock band Stitch Rivet, a regional rock band fronted by Booth's uncle Gene, twin brother of father Jason, who also managed the band. He was accepted into Morehead State University on a music scholarship and an instructor in the music department, Scott Miller, became an early advocate for Booth's talents. Tyler signed a major record deal with Sony Music Nashville in early 2020.

Career 

By 2017, Booth's songwriting and singing was gaining attention, including from songwriter and producer Phil O'Donnell who invited Booth down to Nashville, where he had Booth sing on a number of songs he had written, while also composing additional material. Later that year, Booth self-titled six-song EP that featured the fan favorite Hank Crankin’ People.

Booth was featured on Brooks & Dunn's Reboot (Brooks & Dunn album) album from 2019, joining them on their hit Lost And Found, and his touring commitments have intensified, including runs with Dwight Yoakam and Brantley Gilbert on his 'Kick It In The Ship Cruise':

Later in 2019, Booth released the single Long Comes A Girl, along with Where the Livin' Is, through Villa40/Sony Music Nashville.

Discography

Singles
 "Long Comes a Girl" (Sony Nashville, 2019)
 "Where the Livin' Is" (Sony Nashville, 2019)

EPs
 Self-Titled (Independent, 2017)
 Grab the Reins (Sony Music Entertainment, 2021)

References

External links
 TylerBoothMusic.com

American country singer-songwriters
Living people
People from Morehead, Kentucky
Musicians from Kentucky
Sony Music artists
Country musicians from Kentucky
1996 births